Ramayan is a 1954 Hindi religious film based on Valmiki's Ramayana, produced and directed by Vijay Bhatt for Prakash Pictures. The music directors were Shankar Rao Vyas and Hariprasanna Das and the lyrics were written by Ramesh Gupta, Pandit Indra, Neelkanth Tiwari, Baalam Pardesi. The film starred Prem Adib and Shobhana Samarth once again as Rama and Sita. The two actors had earlier acted in a trilogy of Bhatt's films based on the Ramayana, Bharat Milap (1942), Ram Rajya (1943) and Rambaan (1946). All three had been extremely successful, with the audience accepting them in the traditional roles. The other costars included  Shahu Modak, Durga Khote, and Umakant.

The story revolved around the latter part of the epic Ramayana, focussing on Rama and Sita's twin sons Luv and Kusha.

Cast
 Shobhana Samarth
 Prem Adib
 Shahu Modak
 Durga Khote
 Trilok Kapoor
 Umakant

Soundtrack
The music composers were Shankar Rao Vyas and Hariprasanna Das with Manna Dey singing songs like "Seete Seete Seete Rom Rom Ram Ka", "Tyagmayi Tu Gayi Teri Amar Bhavna" and "Ajab Vidhi Ka Lekh", which was composed by Hariprassana Das. The lyricists were Pandit Indra, Ramesh Gupta, Baalam Pardesi and Neelkanth Tiwari with songs sung by Manna Dey, Phulaji Bua, G. M. Durrani, Amirbai Karnataki, Wamanrao Sadolikar, Shahu Modak, Saraswati Rane, Yashwant, Madhusudan and Baby Tara.

Songlist

References

External links
 

1954 films
1950s Hindi-language films
Hindu mythological films
Films based on the Ramayana
Films directed by Vijay Bhatt